Peter Clement (born 27 March 1946) is an Austrian footballer. He played in two matches for the Austria national football team in 1970.

References

External links
 
 

1946 births
Living people
Austrian footballers
Austria international footballers
Footballers from Vienna
Association football defenders
Wiener Sport-Club players
FC Red Bull Salzburg players